Claudin 3, also known as CLDN3, is a protein which in humans is encoded by the CLDN3 gene. It is a member of the claudin protein family.

Tight junctions represent one mode of cell-to-cell adhesion in epithelial or endothelial cell sheets, forming continuous seals around cells and serving as a physical barrier to prevent solutes and water from passing freely through the paracellular space. These junctions are composed of sets of continuous networking strands in the outwardly facing cytoplasmic leaflet, with complementary grooves in the inwardly facing extracytoplasmic leaflet. The protein encoded by this intron-less gene, a member of the claudin family, is an integral membrane protein and a component of tight junction strands. It is also a low-affinity receptor for Clostridium perfringens enterotoxin, and shares amino acid sequence similarity with a putative apoptosis-related protein found in rat.

Interactions 

CLDN3 has been shown to interact with CLDN1 and CLDN5.

References

External links

Further reading